The 2003 NCAA Division I Outdoor Track and Field Championships were contested at the 82nd annual NCAA-sanctioned track meet to determine the individual and team champions of men's and women's Division I collegiate outdoor track and field in the United States.

This year's meet, the 22nd edition with men's and women's events held concurrently, was contested June 11–14, 2003 at Hornet Stadium at Sacramento State University in Sacramento, California. 

Arkansas won the men's title, the Razorbacks' tenth title and first since winning eight consecutive titles between 1992 and 1999.

LSU won the women's title, the Lady Tigers' then-record thirteenth championship and first since 2000.

Team results 
 Note: Top 10 only
 (DC) = Defending champions
Full results

Men's standings

Women's standings

References

NCAA Men's Outdoor Track and Field Championship
NCAA Division I Outdoor Track And Field Championships
NCAA Division I Outdoor Track And Field Championships
NCAA Division I Outdoor Track and Field Championships
NCAA Women's Outdoor Track and Field Championship